Killer Punjabi is a Punjabi mystery-action-thriller featuring Pooja Batra alongside Gulshan Grover, Kailey Rav and Jasbir Gill. Filmed mostly in Los Angeles, it was directed by Lakhvir Bansi. This film is a debut Punjabi film of Pooja Batra.

Plot

The film revolves around the life of a contract killer Rav, who never fails to kill his targets and faces a dilemma when he is instructed to kill the woman he loves.

Music

Four songs appear in the film, composed by Aslam Keyi and Arvind Kumar.

Cast
 Pooja Batra as Rita Walia
 Kailey Rav as Rav
 Gulshan Grover as Partap
 Jasbir Gill as Banta
 Shai Fali as Pam
 Paul Lazenby as Thug
 Nandini Minocha as Santosh
 Arsh Singh as Sukhi

References 

2016 action thriller films
Indian action thriller films
Punjabi-language Indian films
2010s Punjabi-language films